Longino is a surname. Notable people with the surname include:

 Andrew H. Longino (1854–1942), Governor of Mississippi
 Helen Longino (born 1944), American philosopher

See also
 José Longinos Martínez (1756–1802), Spanish naturalist